NCAA Football 2005 is an American college football video game which was released by EA Sports on July 15, 2004. It is the successor to NCAA Football 2004 in the NCAA Football series. The game features former Pittsburgh Panthers wide receiver Larry Fitzgerald on the cover. This would be the final game in the NCAA Football series to be released for the GameCube.

Gameplay
The main focus of NCAA Football 2005 is home-field advantage. While playing at home is an advantage in any sport, amateur or professional (especially in the playoffs), some say the concept of home-field advantage matters most in college football. Hence, the major addition to the 2005 game is the "Top 25 Toughest Places to Play," compiled by EA Sports. These rankings are based on home winning percentage, average attendance, and "atmosphere" (i.e., fan rowdiness and noise).

Players with the home field advantage on defense can increase the crowd's volume before the snap by repeatedly pressing a certain button on the controller, depending on the system. Likewise, the player with the home field advantage on offense can quiet the crowd with one press of the same button. Crowd noise may affect the quarterback's ability to get an audible across to his other players. If the noise is sufficient, when the quarterback tries to call an audible, one of his teammates will come down to him and gesture that he can't understand him.

Reception

The game was met with very positive reception upon release.  GameRankings and Metacritic gave it a score of 89.45% and 88 out of 100 for the PlayStation 2 version; 88.40% and 89 out of 100 for the Xbox version; and 88.01% and 88 out of 100 for the GameCube version.

References

External links

2004 video games
College football video games
Electronic Arts games
GameCube games
PlayStation 2 games
Xbox games
EA Sports games
North America-exclusive video games
Multiplayer and single-player video games
NCAA video games
Video games developed in the United States